Pragati Singh is an Indian doctor, public health official, and activist. She is known for her work in the Indian asexual community and research on the topic.  She featured on the BBC's 2019 list of 100 inspiring and influential women from around the world.

Early life and education
Singh grew up in Delhi. She graduated with a Bachelor of Medicine, Bachelor of Surgery from Maulana Azad Medical College in 2011.

Career 
Singh is a medical doctor and has worked as a public health professional in the fields of maternal, child, and reproductive health in India. She has worked for organisations such as International SOS and the World Health Organization.

In 2014, Singh found that there were no present communities online for Indians who identify as asexual. As a result of this, she founded the self/non funded group 'Indian Aces' on Facebook, gaining a community of 3000+ members as time passed.

In 2017, Singh launched the friend-finding service 'Platonicity', a google form initially ran through Facebook like Indian Aces, with a goal to one day become a mobile app. The purpose was to have a platform that matches people looking for a non-sexual relationship. It was inspired by frequent messages online by those who needed help with finding relationships, and others whose family were forcing them to get married. It surveyed a large range of factors from an individual's gradient of sexuality to their political stances. Due to the rapid increase of interest towards the form with over 300 entries from multiple countries in two days, it was shut down to create a method that can accommodate more people. Since then she has hosted 'offline meetups' under the same name of Platonicity across Delhi, Bengaluru, and Mumbai, helping with speed dating and building communities. These communities help those who identify as asexual know that they are not alone. When it comes to payment, she runs it under pay what you can model.

In the same year, Singh's research study on asexuality was selected and presented at the World Association of Sexual Health Congress held in Prague. The findings of this study were then published in the Journal of Sexual Medicine. 

As of 2019, Singh continues to run sexuality workshops, speed dating events, as well as group counseling sessions, raising awareness for and helping asexual communities. After extensive research, she has developed the "Comprehensive sexuality model”. This model segregates sexuality into eight central components that form one sexual identity. Another of her future goals is to bring these workshops into medical colleges, to bring her subjects to the eyes of more doctors.

Personal life
In 2014, Singh came across the term 'asexual' and immediately identified with it, and more specifically as gray asexual.

References

External links 
 Indian Aces Website
 Indian Aces Facebook Page
 Singh's "A Study of Trends Observed in Self-Identified ‘Asexual’ People"

Living people
Year of birth missing (living people)
21st-century Indian medical doctors
Asexual women
BBC 100 Women
LGBT-related Internet forums
Indian LGBT people
Indian women medical doctors
Maulana Azad College alumni
Medical doctors from Delhi
World Health Organization officials